KKS could refer to:

 KKS 1925 Kalisz, a football club in Poland
 Giiwo language (ISO 639-3 code), an Afro-Asiatic language spoken in Nigeria
 Kankesanthurai, Sri Lanka
 Kinin–kallikrein system, a hormonal system
 Kirk Sandall railway station, England
 Kool Savas, a rap musician from Germany
 Kristiania Kommunale Sporveie, a defunct tram operator in Oslo, Norway
 Kuala Kangsar, a toll plaza on the North–South Expressway in Malaysia
 Kvindelige Kunstneres Samfund, Danish Society of Female Artists
 Lech Poznań, a football club in Poland
KKS Wiara Lecha, a football club founded by its fans
 The Kirillov-Kostant-Souriau symplectic form of symplectic geometry, see Coadjoint representation.